Puri  is a town and municipality in Uíge Province in Angola. The municipality had a population of 37,910 in 2014.

References

Populated places in Uíge Province
Municipalities of Angola